August Franz Anton Hans Fritzsche (21 April 1900 – 27 September 1953) was the Ministerialdirektor at the Propagandaministerium (Reich Ministry of Public Enlightenment and Propaganda) of Nazi Germany. He was the preeminent German broadcaster of his time, as part of efforts to present a more popular and entertaining side of the Nazi regime, and his voice was recognised by the majority of Germans.

Fritzsche was present in the Berlin Führerbunker during the last days of Adolf Hitler. After Hitler's death, he went over to the Soviet lines in Berlin to offer the surrender of the city to the Red Army on 1 May 1945. He was taken prisoner.

Biography 
Fritzsche was born in Bochum (a city in the Ruhr region) to a Prussian postal clerk. He volunteered in the German Army in 1917 as a private soldier, and served in Flanders. After the war, he studied at the universities of Greifswald and Berlin, but did not graduate. He became a journalist in 1923 for the Hugenberg Press, which promoted nationalistic opinions not very different from the Nazis. In September 1932, he began his broadcasting career as head of the Drahtloser Dienst (the Wireless News service, a government agency), and started his first broadcast, a daily program called "Hans Fritzsche speaks" (Es spricht Hans Fritzsche).

In 1929 or May 1933 he joined the Nazi Party, and later the Sturmabteilung (SA). He was also a member of the Academy for German Law.

On 1 May 1933 the Wireless News service was incorporated into Joseph Goebbels' Propaganda Ministry. In 1938, Fritzsche became head of the Press Division. In November 1942, he became head of the Radio Division. Fritzsche had no involvement in creating policy. During the war, Fritzsche was Germany's most prominent radio commentator.

In April 1945, he was present in the Berlin Führerbunker during the last days of Adolf Hitler and Goebbels. After Hitler's suicide on 30 April 1945, Goebbels assumed Hitler's role as chancellor. On 1 May, Goebbels completed his sole official act as chancellor. He dictated a letter to Soviet Army General Vasily Chuikov, requesting a temporary ceasefire and ordered German General Hans Krebs to deliver it. Chuikov commanded the Soviet forces in central Berlin. After this was rejected, Goebbels decided that further efforts were futile. Goebbels then launched into a tirade berating the generals, reminding them Hitler forbade them to surrender. Fritzsche left the room to try and take matters into his own hands. He went to his nearby office on Wilhelmplatz and wrote a surrender letter addressed to Soviet Marshall Georgy Zhukov. An angry and drunk General Wilhelm Burgdorf followed Fritzsche to his office. There he asked Fritzsche if he intended to surrender Berlin. Fritzsche replied that he was going to do just that. Burgdorf shouted that Hitler had forbidden surrender and as a civilian he had no authority to do so. Burgdorf then pulled his pistol to shoot Fritzsche, but a radio technician knocked the gun and the bullet fired hit the ceiling. Several men then hustled Burgdorf out of the office and he returned to the bunker. Fritzsche then left his office and went over to the Soviet lines and offered to surrender the city.

Military tribunal 

Fritzsche was taken prisoner by Soviet Red Army soldiers. At first he was held prisoner in a basement and then sent to Moscow for interrogation at Lubyanka Prison where, according to his own account, three gold teeth were yanked from his mouth upon arrival. He was confined to a "standing coffin", a  cell where it was impossible to sleep, and placed on a bread and hot water diet. He eventually signed a confession. Later, he wrote his account of Soviet prison while on trial at Nuremberg, which was published in Switzerland.

Fritzsche was sent to Nuremberg, and tried before the International Military Tribunal. He was charged with conspiracy to commit crimes against peace, war crimes and crimes against humanity. In his positions in the propaganda apparatus of the Nazi State, Fritzsche played a role to further the conspiracy to commit atrocities and to launch the war of aggression. According to journalist and author William L. Shirer, it was unclear to the attendees why he was charged. Shirer remarked that "no-one in the courtroom, including Fritzsche, seemed to know why he was there – he was too small a fry – unless it were as a ghost for Goebbels".  According to the IMT prosecution, he "incited and encouraged the commission of War Crimes by deliberately falsifying news to arouse in the German People those passions which led them to the commission of atrocities". Fritzsche was acquitted because the court was "not  prepared  to  hold  that  [his  broadcasts]  were  intended  to incite  the  German  people  to  commit  atrocities  on  conquered  peoples".  He was one of only three defendants to be acquitted at Nuremberg (along with Hjalmar Schacht and Franz von Papen).

Nuremberg prosecutor Alexander Hardy later said that evidence not available to the prosecution at the time proved Fritzsche not only knew of the extermination of European Jews but also "played an important part in bringing [Nazi crimes] about," and would have resulted in his conviction. Fritzsche was later classified as Group I (Major Offenders) by a denazification court which gave him the maximum penalty, nine years of hard labor in a labor camp. He was pardoned in September 1950. He married his second wife, Hildegard Springer, in 1950. He died of cancer in 1953. His wife died the same year.

Fritzsche along with Speer and Schirach were eventually communed by Lutheran Pastor Henry F. Gerecke and were administered the Eucharist.

Publications

 Account of the Nuremberg trials.

See also
Downfall, 2004 German film where he was portrayed by actor Michael Brandner
Reich Ministry of Public Enlightenment and Propaganda

References

Sources

Further reading

Hardy, Alexander G. (1967). Hitler's Secret Weapon: The "Managed" Press and Propaganda Machine of Nazi Germany. New York: Vantage Press.

External links

 

1900 births
1953 deaths
Articles containing video clips
Deaths from cancer in Germany
German anti-communists
German radio personalities
Members of the Academy for German Law
Nazi Party politicians
Nazi propagandists
People acquitted by the International Military Tribunal in Nuremberg
People from Bochum
People from the Province of Westphalia
Sturmabteilung personnel
German Army personnel of World War I